Hereafter is the third album from the Romanian power metal band Magica. It was released in 2007. There is a video for the songs "All Waters Have the Colour of Drowning" and "Entangled".

Track listing 
 "All Waters Have the Colour of Drowning" - 5:13
 "Turn to Stone" - 5:19
 "Through Wine" - 4:24
 "No Matter What" - 4:35
 "Entangled" - 4:36
 "This Is Who I Am" - 4:45
 "The Weight of the World" - 4:51
 "Energy for the Gods" - 4:39
 "Shallow Grave" - 4:13
 "I Remember a Day" - 4:18
 "Into Silence" - 3:27

Digipack  bonus tracks 
 "Endless"
 "Vrajitoarea Cea Rea"

External links 
 Hereafter at Spirit of Metal webzine
 Hereafter at Amazom.com
 Divenia Records

Magica (band) albums
2007 albums
AFM Records albums
Albums with cover art by Jean-Pascal Fournier